The 2006 Stroud Council election took place on 4 May 2006 to elect members of Stroud District Council in Gloucestershire, England. One third of the council was up for election and the Conservative Party stayed in overall control of the council.

After the election, the composition of the council was
Conservative 29
Labour 9
Liberal Democrat 5
Green 5
Independent 3

Election result
The results saw the Conservative Party increase their majority on the council after gaining 2 seats. The Conservatives gained a seat in Cainscross from the Labour Party and Wotton-under-Edge from the Liberal Democrats, while holding the other 11 seats they had been defending. Meanwhile, the Greens gained Over Stroud from the Labour Party and came within 70 votes of taking Nailsworth from the Conservatives. This meant the Greens had 5 seats after the election, the same number as the Liberal Democrats. Overall turnout in the election was 42.16%, a little above the national average.

Ward results

References

2006 English local elections
2006
2000s in Gloucestershire